The 1832 United States presidential election in Tennessee took place between November 2 and December 5, 1832, as part of the 1832 United States presidential election. Voters chose 15 representatives, or electors to the Electoral College, who voted for President and Vice President.

Tennessee voted for the Democratic Party candidate, state native Andrew Jackson, over the National Republican candidate, Henry Clay. Jackson won Tennessee by a large margin of 90.84 percent. This is the most recent election in which Blount County, Carter County, Cocke County, Grainger County, Jefferson County, and Sevier County voted for a Democratic presidential candidate.

Results

References

Tennessee
1832
1832 Tennessee elections